Peacock Records was an American record label, started in 1949 by Don Robey in Houston, Texas, United States.

History
"Hound Dog" by Big Mama Thornton was a hit for Peacock in 1953. Other significant rhythm and blues artists on Peacock were Marie Adams, James Booker, Clarence "Gatemouth" Brown, Little Richard, Memphis Slim, and former gospel singer Jackie Verdell. The label also dabbled in jazz, releasing albums by vocalist Betty Carter and saxophonist Sonny Criss. In 1952, Robey gained control of the Duke Records label of Memphis, Tennessee. Duke/Peacock Records was formed.

For a period of time in the early 1960s, Peacock released gospel music only, issuing singles and albums by some of America's most famous gospel artists, including The Dixie Hummingbirds, The Mighty Clouds of Joy, The Five Blind Boys of Mississippi, Reverend Cleophus Robinson, The Sensational Nightingales, The Gospelaires of Dayton, Ohio, The Pilgrim Jubilee Singers, The Loving Sisters and gospel/jazz group Together (1975), which included saxophonist Felix "Top Cat" Dixon from Kansas City, Kansas.

At the end of 1963, the label launched the gospel subsidiary label Song Bird Records which featured Inez Andrews. In the later 1960s, Peacock again began to issue secular soul singles by artists such as Jackie Verdell, the Inspirations, Little Frankie Lee, Al 'TNT' Bragg and Bud Harper. This later Peacock label featured a bright multi-colored peacock tail on an otherwise blue label background, and it is these later records which are often sought by Northern soul collectors.

The Duke/Peacock family of labels (which also included Back Beat and Sure Shot) was sold to ABC Dunhill Records of Los Angeles on May 23, 1973, with label founder Don Robey staying with ABC as a consultant until his death in 1975. The label name was changed to ABC/Peacock in 1974.

After ABC was sold to MCA Records in 1979, MCA briefly operated an MCA/Songbird label with new signings including Little Anthony (of Little Anthony and the Imperials) and Dan Peek (formerly of the group America). The previous rosters of both ABC-Peacock and ABC-Songbird were dropped (MCA later reissued several Peacock and Song Bird albums at budget price). MCA briefly revived the Peacock name for a series of CD reissues ("Peacock Gospel Classics") in the late 1990s. Along with the MCA back catalog, the Peacock and Song Bird masters are now controlled by the Geffen Records unit of Universal Music Group.

See also
 List of record labels

References

General references
Gart, Galen, and Ames, Roy C., with Funk, Ray; Bowman, Rob; Booth, David (1990). Duke/Peacock Records: An Illustrated History with Discography. Big Nickel Publications, Milford, New Hampshire. .
Hayes, Cedric J., and Laughton, Robert (1992). Gospel Records 1943–1969, A Black Music Discography (Volumes One and Two). Record Information Services, London, England.  (Volume One),  (Volume Two).
Spörke, Michael (2014). Big Mama Thornton: The Life and Music. McFarland Inc. 
Whitburn, Joel (2000). Joel Whitburn Presents Top R & B Singles 1942–1999. Record Research, Menomonee Falls, Wisconsin. .

External links
 Peacock Album Discography
 Arkansas Black Hall of Fame: The Loving Sisters
 The Mighty Clouds Of Joy

Record labels established in 1949
Record labels disestablished in 1979
Re-established companies
Christian record labels
Companies based in Houston
Defunct record labels of the United States